Kvernesfjorden or Kvernesfjord is a fjord between the municipalities of Gjemnes, Kristiansund, Averøy, and Hustadvika in Møre og Romsdal county, Norway.

The fjord begins at the end of the Kornstadfjorden near the village of Eide and runs to the northeast between the island of Averøya and the north shore of the Romsdal peninsula. It then turns to the north around the end of the island of Averøya where it connects to the Bremnesfjorden. The fjord name comes from the village (and former municipality) of Kvernes since that is where the old Kvernes Stave Church is located. The village lies along the eastern entrance to the fjord.

References

Fjords of Møre og Romsdal
Hustadvika (municipality)
Averøy
Gjemnes